The 1983 European Junior Badminton Championships was the eighth edition of the European Junior Badminton Championships. It was held in Helsinki, Finland, in the month of March and April. Denmark won two disciplines, the Boys' singles and Mixed doubles, England won three titles in Girls' singles, Girls' doubles and mixed team championships, while, Wales won the Boys' doubles.

Medalists

Results

Semi-finals

Final

Medal table

References 

European Junior Badminton Championships
European Junior Badminton Championships
European Junior Badminton Championships
European Junior Badminton Championships
International sports competitions hosted by Finland